Palaquium bataanense is a species of plant in the family Sapotaceae. It is found in Indonesia and the Philippines. It is threatened by habitat loss.

References

bataanense
Vulnerable plants
Taxonomy articles created by Polbot